The Canal de Beuvry is a canal in northern France connecting to the Canal Dunkerque-Escaut but no longer navigable all the way to Beuvry.  With the loss of the coal industry in this area, the canal is no longer used.

See also
 List of canals in France

References

Beuvry